The 2010 Women's Rugby World Cup was the sixth edition of the Women's Rugby World Cup and was held in England. The International Rugby Board Executive Committee selected the host union following a recommendation from the Rugby World Cup Limited board after considering bids from the Rugby Football Union and the German Rugby Union – it had been England's third successive bid after being rejected in 2002 and 2006. The tournament was again being organised by the International Rugby Board (IRB) as opposed to the host union, and included five matches for all teams played on 20, 24, 28 August and 1 and 5 September. In May 2009 it was announced that the semi final, 3rd place play off and final would take place at The Stoop and not Twickenham as had previously been suggested. Pool games were held at the Surrey Sports Park in Guildford.

Interest in the tournament was far higher than had been anticipated. It was broadcast to 127 countries and all 2,500 seats at the opening two days of pool games were sold out, as was the third day despite the capacity being raised to 3,200. The semi-finals attracted over 6,000 spectators, while the final drew a crowd of 13,253 – a world record for a women's rugby international – and well as a worldwide TV audience of (according to IRB figures) half a million.

The competition was won by New Zealand who beat England 13–10 in the final.

Three tries from the tournament were shortlisted for the IRB's "Try of the Year" award.

Bidding process 
The Rugby Football Union for Women and the Rugby Football Union along with Germany, South Africa and Kazakhstan made bids to host the 2010 Women's Rugby World Cup. On 23 September, Rugby World Cup Limited Board chairman, Bernard Lapasset, announced that England would host the World Cup at various venues across West London.

Qualifying 

New Zealand, England and France qualified directly as the top three teams from the 2006 World Cup. Wales and Ireland qualified as second and third place finishers in the 2009 Six Nations Championship. Scotland and Sweden qualified as the top two teams from the 2009 European Trophy. The United States, Canada and South Africa qualified directly as the only teams from their region. Kazakhstan qualified after winning the 2009 ARFU Women's Championship. Australia qualified as the second Oceania representative.

Qualified Teams

Tickets and sponsorship
Tickets had been available since 22 March 2010 and they could be purchased online at Ticketmaster or by phone, with an innovative ticketing structure based on some tournament passes and individual match day tickets.
Thirteen matches were broadcast live through a platform provided by host broadcaster Sky Sports in 127 territories to a potential audience of 227 million homes, smashing the 2006 World Cup benchmark in Canada (75 territories and a potential reach of 97 million homes). The programming hours was increased from 60 in 2006 to 220 in this edition.
The commercial partners of the tournament were Nike, Heineken, the Coca-Cola Company's sports drink Powerade, Holiday Inn, British rugby equipment supplier Rhino Rugby, University of Surrey and UK National Lottery.

Squads

Match officials
In December 2009, the IRB announced a panel of 14 match officials for the tournament, including seven world's leading female referees and three specialist assistant referees with previous Women's Rugby World Cup experience.
England's Clare Daniels officiated the opening match between Canada and Scotland, while Australian Sarah Corrigan refereed the final between England and New Zealand.

  Sarah Corrigan
  Clare Daniels
  Gabriel Lee
  Barbara Guastini
  Joyce Henry
  Debbie Innes
  Nicky Inwood
  David Keane
  Kerstin Ljungdahl
  Javier Mancuso
  Andrew McMenemy
  Sébastien Minery
  Dana Teagarden
  Sherry Trumbull

Format
The competition was contested over 16 days and 30 matches between 12 nations, divided into three pools of four teams. The tournament began on 20 August at Surrey Sports Park with a match between Canada and Scotland and ended with the final held at Twickenham Stoop on 5 September between England and New Zealand.

Pool stage

Defending champions New Zealand, hosts and 2006 runners-up England and 2006 bronze winners France all ranked top seeds in their pool. Teams played each other in each pool on a round robin basis, while match points were awarded according to the international standards: 4 points for a win, 2 points for a draw, 1 point for scoring 4 or more tries or for losing by 7 or less than 7 points.
At the end of the pool stage, the teams in a pool were ranked according to their cumulative match points. If two or more teams had been level, the following criteria would have been used in this order until one of the teams could be determined as the higher ranked:
the winner of the match between the two tied teams;
the team with the best points difference;
the team with the best tries difference;
the team with more scored points;
the team with more scored tries;
a toss of coin.

Ranking finals
The teams were seeded based on the position in which they finished in their respective pools and the points scored during the pool stage. The three pool winners and the best runner-up went through to the semi-finals. The other two runners-up and the best two 3rd-place finishers went into a sort of a competition for 5th place, whilst the bottom three teams competed for 9th place.
The ranking finals were set as it follows:
1st seed vs 4th seed;
2nd seed vs 3rd seed;
5th seed vs 8th seed;
6th Seed vs 7th seed;
9th seed vs 12th seed;
10th seed vs 11th seed.

Finals
If teams had been tied at full-time, the winner would have been determined through a 10-minutes extra time (the first team to score any points would have been declared the winner) or eventually a kicking competition (five players from each team would have kicked from three different points on the 22-metre line).

World Cup tournament

Pool stage

Pool A

Pool B

Pool C

Ranking finals

9th–12th place

Semi-finals

11th place match

9th place match

5th–8th place

Semi-finals

7th place match

5th place match

Semi-finals and Final

Semi-finals

3rd place match

Final

Statistics

Teams

Individual leading point scorers

See also
Rugby World Cup
Rugby World Cup Sevens

References

External links 

 Women's RWC official website
 Women's RWC 2010 Qualifying

 
2010
2010 rugby union tournaments for national teams
International women's rugby union competitions hosted by England
2010–11 in English rugby union
2010 in women's rugby union
August 2010 sports events in the United Kingdom
September 2010 sports events in the United Kingdom